Cobia, Rachycentron canadum, is a species of fish.

Cobia may also refer to:
 Cobia, Dâmbovița, a commune in Dâmbovița County, Romania
 Cobia (river), a tributary of the Potop in Dâmbovița County, Romania
 Cobia Island, one of the Ringgold Isles in Fiji
 USS Cobia (SS-245), a submarine